Bordeleza zuria is a synonym for several white grape varieties.

Baroque (grape), a white grape from Southwest France
Courbu, a white grape from Southwest France
Folle Blanche, a white grape that is called Bordeleza zuria in the Basque wine Txakoli